The 2001 Army Black Knights football team was an American football team that represented the United States Military Academy as a member of Conference USA (C-USA) in the 2001 NCAA Division I-A football season. In their second season under head coach Todd Berry, the Black Knights compiled a 3–8 record and were outscored by their opponents by a combined total of 365 to 229.  In the annual Army–Navy Game, the Black Knights defeated Navy, 26–17.

Schedule

Roster

Game summaries

Navy

President George W. Bush was in attendance.

References

Army
Army Black Knights football seasons
Army Cadets football